Labeobarbus gestetneri is a species of ray-finned fish in the genus Labeobarbus.

References 

 

gestetneri
Taxa named by Keith Edward Banister
Taxa named by Roland G. Bailey
Fish described in 1979
Endemic fauna of the Democratic Republic of the Congo